Nyctimystes pallidofemora is a species of tree frog in the subfamily Pelodryadinae, endemic to Papua New Guinea. Scientists disagree about whether this frog is best placed in the genus Nyctimystes or the genus Litoria.

This frog has green coloring on the mucosa of its mouth.  Scientists place it in the same species group as the northern New Guinea tree frog.

References

Amphibians described in 2008
Frogs of Asia
pallidofemora